The 1985 Hardy Cup was the 1985 edition of the Canadian intermediate senior ice hockey championship.

Final
Best of 7
Moose Jaw 5 Charlottetown 3
Moose Jaw 7 Charlottetown 1
Moose Jaw 4 Charlottetown 2
Moose Jaw 11 Charlottetown 0
Moose Jaw Generals beat Charlottetown Islanders 4–0 on series.

External links
Hockey Canada

Hardy Cup
Hardy